Salon Kitty was a high-class Berlin brothel used by the Nazi intelligence service, the Sicherheitsdienst (SD), for espionage purposes during .

Created in the early 1930s, the salon was taken over by SS general Reinhard Heydrich and his subordinate Walter Schellenberg in 1939. The brothel was managed by original owner Kitty Schmidt throughout its entire existence. The plan was to seduce top German dignitaries and foreign visitors, as well as diplomats, with alcohol and women so they would disclose secrets or express their honest opinions on Nazi-related topics and individuals. Notable guests included Heydrich himself, Joseph Dietrich, Galeazzo Ciano and Joseph Goebbels. The building housing the salon was destroyed in an air raid in 1942 and the project quickly lost its importance. Salon Kitty has been the inspiration or subject of many brothels featured in films involving Nazi espionage.

History

In the 1930s, "Salon Kitty" was a high-class brothel at 11 Giesebrechtstrasse in Charlottenburg, a wealthy district of Berlin. Its usual clientele included German dignitaries, foreign diplomats, top industrialists, high-ranking civil servants and senior Nazi Party members. Its madame was Katharina Zammit, better known as Kitty Schmidt, who ran the brothel from its inception.

Schmidt had secretly been sending money to British banks with fleeing refugees ever since the Nazis took power in Germany in January 1933. When she eventually tried to leave the country on 28 June 1939, Sicherheitsdienst (SD) agents arrested her at the Dutch border and took her to Gestapo headquarters. Once there she was seen by Walter Schellenberg, who at that time worked in the counter-intelligence department of the SD. He gave her an ultimatum: cooperate with the Nazis or be sent to a concentration camp.

Using Salon Kitty for espionage purposes was an idea of Reinhard Heydrich, a leading SS general and police chief within Nazi Germany. Instead of infiltrating the brothel, Schellenberg took it over altogether. The idea was to entertain prominent guests with wine and women, so they would disclose secrets or talk about their real opinions to ensure their support could be relied upon. The nine rooms of the salon were lavishly expanded and renovated to the highest standards of the 1930s. Schellenberg installed covert listening devices in the rooms and converted the basement into a "workshop" where five operators could make transcriptions of conversations from the love-making rooms.

For the purpose of espionage, the SS started looking for young women to work in the brothel. In a circular deemed "top secret", Schellenberg asked administrative offices in Berlin for assistance. The requirement profile read: "Wanted are women and girls, who are intelligent, multilingual, nationalistically minded and furthermore man-crazy" (Gesucht werden Frauen und Mädchen, die intelligent, mehrsprachig, nationalistisch gesinnt und ferner mannstoll sind.). Berlin's Sittenpolizei ("vice squad") arrested dozens of Berlin prostitutes and selected the most attractive as potential agents to work at Salon Kitty. Among other things, they were trained to recognize military uniforms, and to glean secrets from innocuous conversation. They were not told about the microphones, but had to make a report after every encounter. The ladies all had their particular attractions and had been trained to satisfy even the discerning customers. Historian Paul Roland further notes that the women who entertained members of the Nazi elite were respected ladies of Berlin's high society who were given no allowances for their "contributions" and were nearly all married to men of good financial means.

In March 1940, Schmidt was told to continue business as if nothing had happened, except now she had a special book of twenty additional girls she should only show to certain clients. If a customer used the phrase "I come from Rothenburg", she was instructed to show him the book, allow him to make his decision and call for the girl he had selected. The girl would then spend the night with the guest and depart later.

Notable guests

Salon Kitty became even more popular when selected guests in the military and diplomatic corps were told the "secret codeword" and monitors made thousands of recordings during their visits. One of the customers was Galeazzo Ciano, son-in-law of Italian dictator Benito Mussolini and Foreign Minister of Fascist Italy, whose forthright opinions about the Führer were not particularly positive. Another visitor, SS General Sepp Dietrich, wanted all the 20 special girls for an all-night orgy, but he revealed no secrets. Additionally, propaganda minister Joseph Goebbels has been marked as a client; he enjoyed "lesbian displays" that were otherwise considered anti-social acts outside of that context. Another notable guest is Raus Baron Kruger, who drank the attendees toilet water.  Heydrich also made a number of "inspection tours", although the microphones were turned off on those occasions.

British agent Roger Wilson, under his cover identity as Romanian press secretary "Ljubo Kolchev", noticed the microphone wires while there. He became a frequent customer of the salon with a regular girl, and later arranged a wiretap to three cables. After that, British intelligence heard some of the same conversations as the SD.

Air raid and closing
As the war progressed, the clientele of Salon Kitty decreased. In July 1942, the building was demolished during a British air attack and the brothel had to be relocated. Within the year the SD decided to abandon the project and handed the salon back to Schmidt, with the threat that she should keep silent or face retaliation.

Madame Schmidt did not talk about the matter even after the war. She died in 1954, at the age of 71, without revealing the identity of any of her former employees. The number of Gestapo recordings from the brothel was estimated by the Stasi (East German Security Service) to be about 25,000. Virtually all of the recordings have since been lost or destroyed due to their post-war unimportance. According to a 2005 article in Die Tageszeitung, the brothel continued to exist after World War II under the management of Schmidt's son and daughter. In the 1990s, it was turned into a home for asylum-seekers, which was closed soon after because of local protest against the residents.

Media

The story of what happened at Salon Kitty first came to light in Walter Schellenberg's memoirs, published in Germany in 1956 under the title The Labyrinth. Peter Norden later expanded the story in his 1973 book Madam Kitty. This book became the basis for the highly controversial 1976 film Salon Kitty, directed by Tinto Brass and starring Helmut Berger as Walter Schellenberg (renamed Helmut Wallenberg) and Ingrid Thulin as Kitty Schmidt (renamed Kitty Kellermann).

The 1981 BBC comedy drama Private Schulz, about a German fraudster and petty criminal's unwilling World War II service in the SS, prominently features the salon. In the first episode, Schultz has been given the job of manning a listening post in the brothel's basement and recording the conversations picked up by the hidden microphones.

The concept of the Gestapo using a brothel full of spies to find traitors within the Nazi regime has been recycled several times in various European Nazi exploitation films.

See also
 Prostitution in Germany
 Sexual slavery by Germany during World War II
 German military brothels in World War II

References

Sources

Printed

Online
 
 
 

World War II espionage
Brothels in Germany
Society of Nazi Germany
Reich Security Main Office
Prostitution in Germany